Puyat is a surname. Notable people with the surname include:

Bernadette Romulo-Puyat (born 1971), Filipino government official
Gil Puyat (1907–1981), Filipino statesman and businessman 
Gonzalo Puyat II (1933–2013), Filipino sport administrator and politician

Tagalog-language surnames